Bishop John Hinchliffe DD (1731 – 11 January 1794 in the Bishop's Palace, Peterborough) was an English churchman and college fellow. He was Master of Trinity College, Cambridge, 1768–88, Bishop of Peterborough, 1769–94, and Dean of Durham, 1788–94.

Life

John Hinchliffe was the son of Joseph Hinchliffe of London. 

John was educated at Westminster School and then studied theology at Trinity College, Cambridge, where he graduated BA in 1754 and became a fellow in 1755. He was ordained by Matthias Mawson as a deacon on 28 December 1756, and as a priest on 19 May 1757. An assistant master at Westminster School from 1757 to 1764, he acted as headmaster for three months in 1764 before becoming tutor to William Cavendish, 5th Duke of Devonshire from 1764 to 1766. Vicar of Greenwich from 1766 to 1769, Hinchliffe was made a Chaplain to George III in 1768, and appointed Master of Trinity College in the same year. In 1769 he was made Bishop of Peterborough. As bishop he played an active role in the House of Lords over the war with America. In 1788 he resigned the Mastership of Trinity. From 1789 until his death Hinchliffe was Dean of Durham. 

He is buried in Peterborough Cathedral. The grave lies in a group of floor stones dedicated to bishops towards the east end.

References

The Master of Trinity at Trinity College, Cambridge

External links

1731 births
1794 deaths
Masters of Trinity College, Cambridge
Bishops of Peterborough
Deans of Durham
Vice-Chancellors of the University of Cambridge
People educated at Westminster School, London
Alumni of Trinity College, Cambridge
Burials at Peterborough Cathedral